Trouble Bound is a 1993 crime comedy-drama film directed by Jeffrey Reiner and starring Patricia Arquette, Billy Bob Thornton, Michael Madsen, and Sal Jenco. The plot concerns an ex-convict who goes on the run with a woman (Patricia Arquette). Unbeknownst to the ex-convict and the woman, a dead body is in the trunk of the Lincoln in which they're riding. Meanwhile, a mafia kingpin's daughter is trying to kill the hitman who killed her father.

Cast
 Michael Madsen as Harry Talbot
 Patricia Arquette as Kit Califano
 Florence Stanley as Grandma Martucci
 Billy Bob Thornton as "Coldface"
 Ginger Lynn Allen as Girl In Porn Movie On TV

Reception
Trouble Bound received mixed review from film critics. On Rotten Tomatoes, the film is rated 46%, indicating marginally rotten reviews.

References

External links

1993 drama films
1990s crime comedy films
American independent films
1993 films
1993 comedy films
1990s English-language films
Films directed by Jeffrey Reiner
1990s American films